= Khwaja Mohamad Amin Darab =

Kashmiri Persian poet

- Born: 1308AH/ 1890-91CE; Kashmir
- Died: 1979; Khywan, Narwara
- Occupations: Poet; scholar
- Father: Khwaja Nur-ud Din Drabu

Khwaja Mohamad Amin Darab (1890–1979) was Kashmir's last Persian poet who left a lot of data on Kashmir heritage. Khwaja Mohamad Amin Darab's 73 rare manuscripts, including 11 books, written by Darab have been put on display at the Amar Singh Club in Srinagar.
